Asemosyrphus polygrammus, the common sickleleg, is a species of rat-tail maggot fly in the family Syrphidae.

This species was formerly a member of the genus Lejops.

References

Eristalinae
Articles created by Qbugbot
Insects described in 1872